Areum may refer to:

 Areum (name)
 Areum-dong